A Yank Comes Back is a 1949 documentary film directed by Colin Dean, starring and written by Burgess Meredith. Meredith produced it when filming Mine Own Executioner in Britain.

References

External links
Film page at Imperial War Museum
A Yank Comes Back at IMDb

1949 documentary films
1949 films
British documentary films
British black-and-white films
1940s British films